David Popa (born 9 December 1997) is a Romanian professional footballer who plays as a forward for Crișul Chișineu-Criș. Born in Aiud, Alba County, Popa played at youth level for Metalul Aiud, Atletico Arad, UTA Arad, Birmingham City and Kettering Town.

International career
Popa played in one match for Romania U-19.

References

External links
 

1997 births
Living people
People from Aiud
Romanian footballers
Association football forwards
Romania youth international footballers
Birmingham City F.C. players
Kettering Town F.C. players
FC UTA Arad players
AC Kajaani players
Oulun Luistinseura players
CSC Dumbrăvița players
Liga II players
Liga III players
Veikkausliiga players
Ykkönen players
Kakkonen players
Romanian expatriate footballers
Romanian expatriate sportspeople in England
Expatriate footballers in England
Expatriate footballers in Finland